Escape perfecto was an Argentine entertainment TV program.

Awards

Nominations
 2015 Martín Fierro Awards: Best entertainment program.

References

Telefe original programming
Argentine variety television shows